Pyrasos F.C. is a Greek football club, based in Nea Anchialos, Magnesia.

The club was founded in 1952. They played in Gamma Ethniki for the two seasons 2014-15 and 2015-16.

Honors

Domestic Titles and honors
 Thessaly Regional Championship: 3
 2007-08, 2012–13, 2013–14
 Thessaly Regional Cup: 3 
 2009-10, 2012–13, 2013–14

External links
 http://pyrasos.com

Football clubs in Thessaly
Association football clubs established in 1952
1952 establishments in Greece